Megachile montivaga is a species of bee in the family Megachilidae. It was described by Cresson in 1878. In English, the species goes by the common name Silver-tailed Petal-cutter Bee while in French its common name is Mégachile des collines.

References

montivaga
Insects described in 1878